Hyalina saintjames is a species of sea snails, a marine gastropod mollusc in the family Marginellidae, the margin snails.

Distribution
Martinique.

References

External links

Marginellidae
Gastropods described in 2016